Carl Harrison High School, commonly known as Harrison High School or simply Harrison is a grades 9-12 public high school in Kennesaw, Georgia, United States.

History 
The school was named for Carl J. Harrison, a member of the Cobb County Board of Education, a member of the Georgia House of Representatives, elected in 1975, and later a Senator in the Georgia State Senate, elected in 1983.

The 2011 movie, "The 5th Quarter", was based on true events that occurred in 2006, in which a member of Harrison High School's lacrosse team was killed in a car accident due to careless driving from classmates.

Sports and clubs

Music 
The Harrison High School Marching Band took part in the Macy's Thanksgiving Day Parade in 2009 and 2016.

Notable alumni

 Darvin Adams - Canadian Football League (CFL) wide receiver
 Joe Bendik - Major League Soccer (MLS) goalkeeper
 Bradford Cox - Rock Musician (Deerhunter and Atlas Sound) and Actor (Dropped Out)
 Adam Everett - Major League Baseball (MLB) player
 Justin Fields - National Football League (NFL) quarterback and star of Netflix series ‘QB1’
 Paul Oliver - NFL safety
 Corey Patterson - MLB player  
 Eric Patterson - MLB player
 Brian Rogers - MLB relief pitcher
 Ollie Schniederjans - PGA Tour and Korn Ferry Tour golfer

References

External links
 Carl Harrison High School

Public high schools in Georgia (U.S. state)
Schools in Cobb County, Georgia
1991 establishments in Georgia (U.S. state)
Educational institutions established in 1991